The Ordnance BL 5.4-inch howitzer was a version of the British 5-inch howitzer designed for British Indian Army use, especially on the Northwest Frontier.

Design

The unusual calibre of 5.4 inches may have been determined by a requirement to fire a 60 lb shell. Since the 5-inch howitzer with its 50 lb shell was later found deficient in both firepower and range, it is possible the Indian Army may have foreseen this, and in fact the 5.4-inch could fire its 60 lb shell the same distance as the 5-inch fired its 50 lb shell i.e. 4800 yards. Also, Hogg & Thurston surmise that raw weight of shell was seen as necessary in India to "put a reasonable amount of fear into the hearts of obstreperous tribesmen inhabiting home-built but robust local fortresses": different conditions than regular British Army artillery was expected to be employed in.

Combat service

World War I
Four guns were sent from India and served in the East Africa campaign. They were manned by the 134th (Cornwall) Howitzer Battery (TF) from England. The battery was formed at Maktau on 4 February 1916 and drawn by oxen.

The battery is reported as firing 102 rounds in the bombardment of German positions on the Mgeta river (approximately  SW of Dar es Salam) on 1 January 1917, part of the Rufiji River campaign. This allowed Cunliffe's Nigerian Brigade to cross the Mgeta river and pursue the German force south. One of the guns was destroyed by a premature explosion in this action, with 1 gunner killed and 2 wounded.

The 134th Battery landed at Lindi in the far south of German East Africa near the border with Portuguese East Africa (Mozambique) in October 1917 and moved west inland. Two of their 5.4-inch howitzers were sent to Morogoro to be used for training, and they took over two 5-inch howitzers from 11th (Hull) Battery, who were short of men through sickness. The 134th were then heavily engaged using one 5.4-inch and two 5-inch howitzers at the major Battle of Nyangao on 16–18 October 1917. The guns knocked out the last of the ten 4.1-inch guns from the Königsberg which the German forces had used as field guns, and provided fire support for the Indian and Nigerian troops.

Ammunition

See also 
Howitzer
List of howitzers

Notes and references

Bibliography
 General Sir Martin Farndale, History of the Royal Regiment of Artillery. The Forgotten Fronts and the Home Base, 1914–18. London : The Royal Artillery Institution, 1988. 
 I.V. Hogg & L.F. Thurston, British Artillery Weapons & Ammunition 1914–1918. London: Ian Allan, 1972

External links

 Handbook for the 5.4 inch B.L. howitzer mark I 1897, 1902 Hosted online by the State Library of Victoria, Australia

Field artillery
World War I howitzers
World War I artillery of the United Kingdom
138 mm artillery